

Events

Pre-1600
48 BC – Caesar's Civil War: Battle of Pharsalus: Julius Caesar decisively defeats Pompey at Pharsalus and Pompey flees to Egypt.
 378 – Gothic War: Battle of Adrianople: A large Roman army led by Emperor Valens is defeated by the Visigoths. Valens is killed along with over half of his army.
1173 – Construction of the campanile of the Cathedral of Pisa (now known as the Leaning Tower of Pisa) begins; it will take two centuries to complete.
1329 – Quilon, the first Indian Christian Diocese, is erected by Pope John XXII; the French-born Jordanus is appointed the first Bishop.
1428 – Sources cite biggest caravan trade between Podvisoki and Republic of Ragusa. Vlachs committed to Ragusan lord Tomo Bunić, that they will with 600 horses deliver 1,500 modius of salt. Delivery was meant for Dobrašin Veseoković, and Vlachs price was half of delivered salt.
1500 – Ottoman–Venetian War (1499–1503): The Ottomans capture Methoni, Messenia.

1601–1900
1610 – The First Anglo-Powhatan War begins in colonial Virginia.
1810 – Napoleon annexes Westphalia as part of the First French Empire.
1814 – American Indian Wars: The Creek sign the Treaty of Fort Jackson, giving up huge parts of Alabama and Georgia.
1830 – Louis Philippe becomes the king of the French following abdication of Charles X.
1842 – The Webster–Ashburton Treaty is signed, establishing the United States–Canada border east of the Rocky Mountains.
1854 – American Transcendentalist philosopher Henry David Thoreau publishes his memoir Walden.
1855 – Åland War: The Battle of Suomenlinna begins.
1862 – American Civil War: Battle of Cedar Mountain: At Cedar Mountain, Virginia, Confederate General Stonewall Jackson narrowly defeats Union forces under General John Pope.
1877 – American Indian Wars: Battle of the Big Hole: A small band of Nez Percé Indians clash with the United States Army.
1892 – Thomas Edison receives a patent for a two-way telegraph.
1897 – The first International Congress of Mathematicians is held in Zürich, Switzerland.

1901–present
1902 – Edward VII and Alexandra of Denmark are crowned King and Queen of the United Kingdom of Great Britain and Ireland.
1907 – The first Boy Scout encampment concludes at Brownsea Island in southern England.
1925 – A train robbery takes place in Kakori, near Lucknow, India, by the Indian independence revolutionaries, against British government.
1936 – Summer Olympics: Jesse Owens wins his fourth gold medal at the games.
1942 – World War II: Battle of Savo Island: Allied naval forces protecting their amphibious forces during the initial stages of the Battle of Guadalcanal are surprised and defeated by an Imperial Japanese Navy cruiser force.
1944 – The United States Forest Service and the Wartime Advertising Council release posters featuring Smokey Bear for the first time.
  1944   – Continuation War: The Vyborg–Petrozavodsk Offensive, the largest offensive launched by Soviet Union against Finland during the Second World War, ends to a strategic stalemate. Both Finnish and Soviet troops at the Finnish front dug to defensive positions, and the front remains stable until the end of the war.
1945 – World War II: Nagasaki is devastated when an atomic bomb, Fat Man, is dropped by the United States B-29 Bockscar. Thirty-five thousand people are killed outright, including 23,200–28,200 Japanese war workers, 2,000 Korean forced workers, and 150 Japanese soldiers.
  1945   – The Red Army invades Japanese-occupied Manchuria.
1960 – South Kasai secedes from the Congo.
1965 – Singapore is expelled from Malaysia and becomes the only country to date to gain independence unwillingly.
1969 – Tate–LaBianca murders: Followers of Charles Manson murder pregnant actress Sharon Tate (wife of Roman Polanski), coffee heiress Abigail Folger, Polish actor Wojciech Frykowski, men's hairstylist Jay Sebring and recent high-school graduate Steven Parent.
1970 – LANSA Flight 502 crashes after takeoff from Alejandro Velasco Astete International Airport in Cusco, Peru, killing 99 of the 100 people on board, as well as two people on the ground.
1971 – The Troubles: In Northern Ireland, the British authorities launch Operation Demetrius. The operation involves the mass arrest and internment without trial of individuals suspected of being affiliated with the Irish Republican Army (PIRA). Mass riots follow, and thousands of people flee or are forced out of their homes.
1973 – Mars 7 is launched from the USSR.
1974 – As a direct result of the Watergate scandal, Richard Nixon becomes the first President of the United States to resign from office. Vice President Gerald Ford becomes president.
1991 – The Italian prosecuting magistrate Antonino Scopelliti is murdered by the 'Ndrangheta on behalf of the Sicilian Mafia while preparing the government's case in the final appeal of the Maxi Trial.
1993 – The Liberal Democratic Party of Japan loses a 38-year hold on national leadership.
1999 – Russian President Boris Yeltsin fires his Prime Minister, Sergei Stepashin, and for the fourth time fires his entire cabinet.
2006 – At least 21 suspected terrorists are arrested in the 2006 transatlantic aircraft plot that happened in the United Kingdom. The arrests are made in London, Birmingham, and High Wycombe in an overnight operation.
2007 – Air Moorea Flight 1121 crashes after takeoff from Moorea Airport in French Polynesia, killing all 20 people on board.
2012 – Shannon Eastin becomes the first woman to officiate an NFL game.
2013 – Gunmen open fire at a Sunni mosque in the city of Quetta killing at least ten people and injuring 30.
2014 – Michael Brown, an 18-year-old African American male in Ferguson, Missouri, is shot and killed by a Ferguson police officer after reportedly assaulting the officer and attempting to steal his weapon, sparking protests and unrest in the city.
2021 – The Tampere light rail officially started operating.

Births

Pre-1600
1201 – Arnold Fitz Thedmar, English historian and merchant (d. 1274)
1537 – Francesco Barozzi, Italian mathematician and astronomer (d. 1604)
1544 – Bogislaw XIII, Duke of Pomerania (d. 1606)
1590 – John Webster, colonial settler and governor of Connecticut (d. 1661)

1601–1900
1603 – Johannes Cocceius, German-Dutch theologian and academic (d. 1669)
1611 – Henry of Nassau-Siegen, German count, officer in the Dutch Army, diplomat for the Dutch Republic (b. 1611)
1648 – Johann Michael Bach, German composer (d. 1694)
1653 – John Oldham, English poet and translator (d. 1683)
1674 – František Maxmilián Kaňka, Czech architect, designed the Veltrusy Mansion (d. 1766)
1696 – Joseph Wenzel I, Prince of Liechtenstein (d. 1772)
1722 – Prince Augustus William of Prussia (d. 1758)
1726 – Francesco Cetti, Italian priest, zoologist, and mathematician (d. 1778)
1748 – Bernhard Schott, German music publisher (d. 1809)
1757 – Elizabeth Schuyler Hamilton, American humanitarian; wife of Alexander Hamilton (d. 1854)
  1757   – Thomas Telford, Scottish architect and engineer, designed the Menai Suspension Bridge (d. 1834)
1776 – Amedeo Avogadro, Italian physicist and chemist (d. 1856)
1783 – Grand Duchess Alexandra Pavlovna of Russia (d. 1801)
1788 – Adoniram Judson, American missionary and lexicographer (d. 1850)
1797 – Charles Robert Malden, English lieutenant and surveyor (d. 1855)
1805 – Joseph Locke, English engineer and politician (d. 1860)
1845 – André Bessette, Canadian saint (d. 1937)
1847 – Maria Vittoria dal Pozzo, French-Italian wife of Amadeo I of Spain (d. 1876)
1848 – Alfred David Benjamin, Australian-born businessman and philanthropist. (d. 1900)
1861 – Dorothea Klumpke, American astronomer and academic (d. 1942)
1867 – Evelina Haverfield, Scottish nurse and activist (d. 1920)
1872 – Archduke Joseph August of Austria (d. 1962)
1874 – Reynaldo Hahn, Venezuelan composer and conductor (d. 1947)
1875 – Albert Ketèlbey, English pianist, composer, and conductor (d. 1959)
1878 – Eileen Gray, Irish architect and furniture designer (d. 1976)
1879 – John Willcock, Australian politician, 15th Premier of Western Australia, (d. 1956)
1881 – Prince Antônio Gastão of Orléans-Braganza, Brazilian prince (d. 1918)
1890 – Eino Kaila, Finnish philosopher and psychologist, attendant of the Vienna circle (d. 1958)
1896 – Erich Hückel, German physicist and chemist (d. 1980)
  1896   – Jean Piaget, Swiss psychologist and philosopher (d. 1980)
1899 – P. L. Travers, Australian-English author and actress (d. 1996)
1900 – Charles Farrell, American actor and singer (d. 1990)

1901–present
1902 – Zino Francescatti, French violinist (d. 1991)
  1902   – Panteleimon Ponomarenko, Russian general and politician (d. 1984)
1905 – Leo Genn, British actor and barrister (d. 1978)
1909 – Vinayaka Krishna Gokak, Indian scholar, author, and academic (d. 1992)
  1909   – Willa Beatrice Player, American educator, first Black woman college president (d. 2003)
  1909   – Adam von Trott zu Solz, German lawyer and diplomat (d. 1944)
1911 – William Alfred Fowler, American astronomer and astrophysicist, Nobel Laureate (d. 1996)
  1911   – Eddie Futch, American boxer and trainer (d. 2001)
  1911   – John McQuade, Northern Irish soldier, boxer, and politician (d. 1984)
1913 – Wilbur Norman Christiansen, Australian astronomer and engineer (d. 2007)
1914 – Ferenc Fricsay, Hungarian-Austrian conductor and director (d. 1963)
  1914   – Tove Jansson, Finnish author and illustrator (d. 2001)
  1914   – Joe Mercer, English footballer and manager (d. 1990)
1915 – Mareta West, American astronomer and geologist (d. 1998)
1918 – Kermit Beahan, American colonel (d. 1989)
  1918   – Giles Cooper, Irish soldier and playwright (d. 1966)
  1918   – Albert Seedman, American police officer (d. 2013)
1919 – Joop den Uyl, Dutch journalist, economist, and politician, Deputy Prime Minister of the Netherlands (d. 1987)
  1919   – Ralph Houk, American baseball player and manager (d. 2010)
1920 – Enzo Biagi, Italian journalist and author (d. 2007)
1921 – Ernest Angley, American evangelist and author (d. 2021)
  1921   – J. James Exon, American soldier and politician, 33rd Governor of Nebraska (d. 2005)
1922 – Philip Larkin, English poet and novelist (d. 1985)
1924 – Mathews Mar Barnabas, Indian metropolitan (d. 2012)
  1924   – Frank Martínez, American soldier and painter (d. 2013)
1925 – David A. Huffman, American computer scientist, developed Huffman coding (d. 1999)
1926 – Denis Atkinson, Barbadian cricketer (d. 2001)
1927 – Daniel Keyes, American short story writer and novelist (d. 2014)
  1927   – Robert Shaw, English actor and screenwriter (d. 1978)
1928 – Bob Cousy, American basketball player and coach
  1928   – Camilla Wicks, American violinist and educator (d. 2020)
  1928   – Dolores Wilson, American soprano and actress (d. 2010)
1929 – Abdi İpekçi, Turkish journalist and activist (d. 1979)
1930 – Milt Bolling, American baseball player and scout (d. 2013)
  1930   – Jacques Parizeau, Canadian economist and politician, 26th Premier of Quebec (d. 2015)
1931 – Chuck Essegian, American baseball player and lawyer
  1931   – James Freeman Gilbert, American geophysicist and academic (d. 2014)
  1931   – Paula Kent Meehan, American businesswoman, co-founded Redken (d. 2014)
  1931   – Mário Zagallo, Brazilian footballer and coach
1932 – Tam Dalyell, Scottish academic and politician (d. 2017)
  1932   – John Gomery, Canadian lawyer and jurist (d. 2021)
1933 – Tetsuko Kuroyanagi, Japanese actress, talk show host, and author
1935 – Beverlee McKinsey, American actress (d. 2008)
1936 – Julián Javier, Dominican-American baseball player
  1936   – Patrick Tse, Chinese-Hong Kong actor, director, producer, and screenwriter
1938 – Leonid Kuchma, Ukrainian engineer and politician, 2nd President of Ukraine
  1938   – Rod Laver, Australian tennis player and coach
  1938   – Otto Rehhagel, German footballer, coach, and manager
1939 – Hércules Brito Ruas, Brazilian footballer
  1939   – Vincent Hanna, Northern Irish journalist (d. 1997)
  1939   – The Mighty Hannibal, American singer-songwriter and producer (d. 2014)
  1939   – Billy Henderson, American singer (d. 2007)
  1939   – Bulle Ogier, French actress and screenwriter
  1939   – Romano Prodi, Italian academic and politician, 52nd Prime Minister of Italy
  1939   – Butch Warren, American bassist (d. 2013)
1940 – Linda Keen, American mathematician and academic
1942 – David Steinberg, Canadian actor, director, producer, and screenwriter
1943 – Ken Norton, American boxer and actor (d. 2013)
1944 – George Armstrong, English footballer (d. 2000)
  1944   – Patrick Depailler, French racing driver (d. 1980)
  1944   – Sam Elliott, American actor and producer
  1944   – Patricia McKissack, American soldier, engineer, and author (d. 2022)
1945 – Barbara Delinsky, American author
  1945   – Aleksandr Gorelik, Russian figure skater and sportscaster (d. 2012)
  1945   – Posy Simmonds, English author and illustrator
1946 – Rinus Gerritsen, Dutch rock bass player
1947 – Roy Hodgson, English footballer and manager
  1947   – Barbara Mason, American R&B/soul singer-songwriter
  1947   – John Varley, American author
1948 – Bill Campbell, American baseball player and coach
1949 – Jonathan Kellerman, American psychologist and author
  1949   – Ted Simmons, American baseball player and coach
1951 – James Naughtie, Scottish journalist and radio host
  1951   – Steve Swisher, American baseball player and manager
1952 – Prateep Ungsongtham Hata, Thai activist and politician
1953 – Kay Stenshjemmet, Norwegian speed skater
  1953   – Jean Tirole, French economist and academic, Nobel Prize laureate
1954 – Ray Jennings, South African cricketer and coach
  1954   – Pete Thomas, English drummer
1955 – John E. Sweeney, American lawyer and politician
1956 – Gordon Singleton, Canadian Olympic cyclist
1957 – Melanie Griffith, American actress and producer
1958 – Amanda Bearse, American actress, comedian and director
  1958   – James Lileks, American journalist and blogger
  1958   – Calie Pistorius, South African engineer and academic
1959 – Kurtis Blow, American rapper, producer, and actor
  1959   – Michael Kors, American fashion designer
1961 – Brad Gilbert, American tennis player and sportscaster
  1961   – John Key, New Zealand businessman and politician, 38th Prime Minister of New Zealand
1962 – Louis Lipps, American football player and radio host
  1962   – Kevin Mack, American football player
  1962   – John "Hot Rod" Williams, American basketball player (d. 2015)
1963 – Whitney Houston, American singer-songwriter, producer, and actress (d. 2012)
  1963   – Jay Leggett, American actor, director, producer, and screenwriter (d. 2013)
  1963   – Barton Lynch, Australian surfer
1964 – Brett Hull, Canadian-American ice hockey player and manager
  1964   – Hoda Kotb, American journalist and television personality
1966 – Vinny Del Negro, American basketball player and coach
  1966   – Linn Ullmann, Norwegian journalist and author
1967 – Deion Sanders, American football and baseball player
1968 – Gillian Anderson, American-British actress, activist and writer
  1968   – Eric Bana, Australian actor, comedian, producer, and screenwriter
  1968   – Sam Fogarino, American drummer
  1968   – McG, American director and producer
1969 – Troy Percival, American baseball player and coach
1970 – Rod Brind'Amour, Canadian ice hockey player and coach
  1970   – Chris Cuomo, American lawyer and journalist
 1970    – Thomas Lennon, American actor and comedian
1973 – Filippo Inzaghi, Italian footballer and manager
  1973   – Kevin McKidd, Scottish actor and director
  1973   – Gene Luen Yang, American author and illustrator
1974 – Derek Fisher, American basketball player and coach
  1974   – Stephen Fung, Hong Kong actor, singer, director, and screenwriter
  1974   – Lesley McKenna, Scottish snowboarder
  1974   – Matt Morris, American baseball player
  1974   – Kirill Reznik, American lawyer and politician
  1974   – Raphaël Poirée, French biathlete
1975 – Mahesh Babu, Indian actor and producer
  1975   – Valentin Kovalenko, Uzbek football referee
  1975   – Mike Lamb, American baseball player
  1975   – Robbie Middleby, Australian soccer player
1976 – Rhona Mitra, English actress and singer
  1976   – Audrey Tautou, French model and actress
  1976   – Jessica Capshaw, American actress
1977 – Jason Frasor, American baseball player
  1977   – Chamique Holdsclaw, American basketball player
  1977   – Ravshan Irmatov, Uzbek football referee
  1977   – Adewale Ogunleye, American football player
  1977   – Ime Udoka, American basketball player and coach
  1977   – Mikaël Silvestre, French footballer
1978 – Dorin Chirtoacă, Moldavian lawyer and politician, Mayor of Chișinău
  1978   – Ana Serradilla, Mexican actress and producer
  1978   – Wesley Sonck, Belgian footballer
1979 – Michael Kingma, Australian basketball player
  1979   – Lisa Nandy, British politician
  1979   – Tony Stewart, American football player
1981 – Jarvis Hayes, American basketball player
  1981   – Li Jiawei, Singaporean table tennis player
1982 – Joel Anthony, American basketball player
  1982   – Tyson Gay, American sprinter
  1982   – Yekaterina Samutsevich, Russian singer and activist
  1982   – Kanstantsin Sivtsov, Belorussian cyclist
1983 – Dan Levy, Canadian actor and comedian
  1983   – Hamilton Masakadza, Zimbabwean cricketer
  1983   – Shane O'Brien, Canadian ice hockey player
  1983   – Alicja Smietana, Polish-English violinist
1984 – Paul Gallagher, Scottish footballer
1985 – Luca Filippi, Italian racing driver
  1985   – Filipe Luís, Brazilian footballer
  1985   – Anna Kendrick, American actress and singer
  1985   – Hayley Peirsol, American swimmer
  1985   – JaMarcus Russell, American football player
  1985   – Chandler Williams, American football player (d. 2013)
1986 – Michael Lerchl, German footballer
  1986   – Daniel Preussner, German rugby player
  1986   – Tyler Smith, American singer-songwriter and bass player
1987 – Marek Niit, Estonian sprinter
1988 – Anthony Castonzo, American football player
  1988   – Willian, Brazilian footballer
  1988   – Vasilios Koutsianikoulis, Greek footballer
1989 – Jason Heyward, American baseball player
  1989   – Stefano Okaka, Italian footballer
  1989   – Kento Ono, Japanese actor and model
1990 – İshak Doğan, Turkish footballer
  1990   – Stuart McInally, Scottish rugby player
  1990   – Brice Roger, French skier
  1990   – Sarah McBride, American LGBT activist
  1990   – D'Arcy Short, Australian cricketer 
1991 – Alice Barlow, English actress
  1991   – Alexa Bliss, American bodybuilder and wrestler
  1991   – Hansika Motwani, Indian actress 
1992 – Farahnaz Forotan, Afghan journalist
1993 – Jun.Q, South Korean singer and actor
  1993   – Dipa Karmakar, Indian gymnast
1994 – Kelli Hubly, American soccer player
1995 – Eli Apple, American football player
1996 – Sanya Lopez, Filipino actress and model
1999 – Deniss Vasiļjevs, Latvian figure skater
2000 – Arlo Parks, British singer-songwriter
2005 – Victoria Jiménez Kasintseva, Andorran tennis player

Deaths

Pre-1600
 378 – Traianus, Roman general
   378   – Valens, Roman emperor (b. 328)
 803 – Irene of Athens, Byzantine ruler (b. 752)
 833 – Al-Ma'mun, Iraqi caliph (b. 786)
1048 – Pope Damasus II
1107 – Emperor Horikawa of Japan (b. 1079)
1173 – Najm ad-Din Ayyub, Kurdish soldier and politician
1211 – William de Braose, 4th Lord of Bramber, exiled Anglo-Norman baron (b. 1144/53)
1260 – Walter of Kirkham, Bishop of Durham
1296 – Hugh, Count of Brienne, French crusader
1341 – Eleanor of Anjou, queen consort of Sicily (b. 1289)
1354 – Stephen, Duke of Slavonia, Hungarian prince (b. 1332)
1420 – Pierre d'Ailly, French theologian and cardinal (b. 1351)
1516 – Hieronymus Bosch, Early Netherlandish painter (b. circa 1450)
1534 – Thomas Cajetan, Italian cardinal and philosopher (b. 1470)
1580 – Metrophanes III of Constantinople (b. 1520)

1601–1900
1601 – Michael the Brave, Romanian prince (b. 1558)
1634 – William Noy, English lawyer and judge (b. 1577)
1720 – Simon Ockley, English orientalist and academic (b. 1678)
1744 – James Brydges, 1st Duke of Chandos, English academic and politician, Lord Lieutenant of Radnorshire (b. 1673)
1816 – Johann August Apel, German jurist and author (b. 1771)
1861 – Vincent Novello, English composer and publisher (b. 1781)
1886 – Samuel Ferguson, Irish lawyer and poet (b. 1810)

1901–present
1910 – Huo Yuanjia, Chinese martial artist, co-founded the Chin Woo Athletic Association (b. 1868)
1919 – Ruggero Leoncavallo, Italian composer and educator (b. 1857)
1920 – Samuel Griffith, Welsh-Australian politician, 9th Premier of Queensland (b. 1845)
1932 – John Charles Fields, Canadian mathematician, founder of the Fields Medal (b. 1863)
1941 – Richard Goss, Executed Irish Republican (b. 1915)
1942 – Edith Stein, German nun and saint (b. 1891)
1943 – Chaïm Soutine, Belarusian-French painter and educator (b. 1893)
1945 – Robert Hampton Gray, Canadian lieutenant and pilot, Victoria Cross recipient (b. 1917)
  1945   – Harry Hillman, American runner and coach (b. 1881)
1946 – Bert Vogler, South African cricketer (b. 1876)
1948 – Hugo Boss, German fashion designer, founded Hugo Boss (b. 1885)
1949 – Edward Thorndike, American psychologist and academic (b. 1874)
1957 – Carl Clauberg, German Nazi physician (b. 1898)
1962 – Hermann Hesse, German-born Swiss poet, novelist, and painter, Nobel Prize laureate (b. 1877)
1963 – Patrick Bouvier Kennedy, American son of John F. Kennedy (b. 1963)
1967 – Joe Orton, English author and playwright (b. 1933)
1969 – Wojciech Frykowski, Polish-American actor and author (b. 1936)
  1969   – Sharon Tate, American model and actress (b. 1943)
  1969   – C. F. Powell, English physicist and academic, Nobel Prize laureate (b. 1903)
1972 – Sıddık Sami Onar, Turkish lawyer and academic (b. 1897)
1974 – Bill Chase, American trumpet player and bandleader (b. 1934)
1975 – Dmitri Shostakovich, Russian pianist and composer (b. 1906)
1978 – James Gould Cozzens, American novelist and short story writer (b. 1903)
1979 – Walter O'Malley, American businessman (b. 1903)
  1979   – Raymond Washington, American gang leader, founded the Crips (b. 1953)
1980 – Jacqueline Cochran, American pilot (b. 1906)
  1980   – Ruby Hurley, American civil rights activist (b. 1909)
1981 – Max Hoffman, Austrian-born car importer and businessman (b. 1904)
1985 – Clive Churchill, Australian rugby league player and coach (b. 1927)
1988 – M. Carl Holman, American author, educator, poet, and playwright (b. 1919)
1988 – Giacinto Scelsi, Italian composer (b. 1905)
1990 – Joe Mercer, English footballer and manager (b. 1914)
1992 – Fereydoun Farrokhzad, Iranian singer and actor (b. 1938)
1995 – Jerry Garcia, American singer-songwriter and guitarist (b. 1942)
1996 – Frank Whittle, English soldier and engineer, invented the jet engine (b. 1907)
1999 – Helen Rollason, English sports journalist and sportscaster (b. 1956)
  1999   – Fouad Serageddin, Egyptian journalist and politician (b. 1910)
2000 – John Harsanyi, Hungarian-American economist and academic, Nobel Prize laureate (b. 1920)
  2000   – Nicholas Markowitz, American murder victim (b. 1984)
2002 – Paul Samson, English guitarist (b. 1953)
2003 – Jacques Deray, French director and screenwriter (b. 1929)
  2003   – Ray Harford, English footballer and manager (b. 1945)
  2003   – Gregory Hines, American actor, dancer, and choreographer (b. 1946)
  2003   – R. Sivagurunathan, Sri Lankan lawyer, journalist, and academic (b. 1931)
2004 – Robert Lecourt, French lawyer and politician, Lord Chancellor of France (b. 1908)
  2004   – Tony Mottola, American guitarist and composer (b. 1918)
  2004   – David Raksin, American composer and educator (b. 1912)
2005 – Judith Rossner, American author (b. 1935)
2006 – Philip E. High, English author (b. 1914)
  2006   – James Van Allen, American physicist and academic (b. 1914)
2007 – Joe O'Donnell, American photographer and journalist (b. 1922)
2008 – Bernie Mac, American comedian, actor, screenwriter, and producer (b. 1957)
  2008   – Mahmoud Darwish, Palestinian author and poet (b. 1941)
2010 – Calvin "Fuzz" Jones, American singer and bass player (b. 1926)
  2010   – Ted Stevens, American soldier, lawyer, and politician (b. 1923)
2012 – Carl Davis, American record producer (b. 1934)
  2012   – Gene F. Franklin, American engineer, theorist, and academic (b. 1927)
  2012   – Al Freeman, Jr., American actor, director, and educator (b. 1934)
  2012   – David Rakoff, Canadian-American actor and journalist (b. 1964)
  2012   – Carmen Belen Richardson, Puerto Rican-American actress (b. 1930)
  2012   – Mel Stuart, American director and producer (b. 1928)
2013 – Harry Elliott, American baseball player and coach (b. 1923)
  2013   – Eduardo Falú, Argentinian guitarist and composer (b. 1923)
  2013   – William Lynch, Jr., American lawyer and politician (b. 1947)
2014 – J. F. Ade Ajayi, Nigerian historian and academic (b. 1929)
  2014   – Andriy Bal, Ukrainian footballer and coach (b. 1958)
  2014   – Arthur G. Cohen, American businessman and philanthropist, co-founded Arlen Realty and Development Corporation (b. 1930)
  2014   – Ed Nelson, American actor (b. 1928)
2015 – Frank Gifford, American football player, sportscaster, and actor (b. 1930)
  2015   – John Henry Holland, American computer scientist and academic (b. 1929)
  2015   – Walter Nahún López, Honduran footballer (b. 1977)
  2015   – David Nobbs, English author and screenwriter (b. 1935)
  2015   – Kayyar Kinhanna Rai, Indian journalist, author, and poet (b. 1915)
  2015   – Fikret Otyam, Turkish painter and journalist (b. 1926)
2016 – Gerald Grosvenor, 6th Duke of Westminster, third-richest British citizen (b. 1951)
2021 – Pat Hitchcock, English actress and producer (b. 1928)
  2021   – Killer Kau, South African rapper, dancer and record producer (b. 1998)
  2021   – Zairaini Sarbini, 48, Malaysian voice actress (b. 1972)

Holidays and observances
Battle of Gangut Day (Russia)
Christian feast day:
Candida Maria of Jesus
Edith Stein (St Teresa Benedicta of the Cross)
Firmus and Rusticus
Herman of Alaska (Russian Orthodox Church and related congregations; Episcopal Church (USA))
John Vianney (1950s – currently August 4)
Mary Sumner (Church of England)
Nath Í of Achonry
Romanus Ostiarius
Secundian, Marcellian and Verian
August 9 (Eastern Orthodox liturgics)
International Day of the World's Indigenous Peoples (United Nations)
Meyboom (Brussels and Leuven, Belgium)
National Day, celebrates the independence of Singapore from Malaysia in 1965.
National Peacekeepers' Day, celebrated on Sunday closest to the day (Canada)
National Women's Day (South Africa)

References

External links

 
 
 

Days of the year
August